The Ståhlberg kidnapping refers to an incident that occurred on October 14, 1930, at approximately 9:00 am EET, in which the former and first President of Finland, Kaarlo Juho Ståhlberg, and his wife, Ester Ståhlberg, were abducted from their home in Helsinki, Finland, by members of the Lapua Movement. The kidnapping was spearheaded by an ex-White general by the name of Kurt Martti Wallenius. Threats of execution were issued when the Lapuans' demands were not met, however Wallenius and his henchmen were too incompetent to handle the kidnapping and too hesitant to carry out their murder threat. The Finnish public was both ashamed and horrified by this pointless act of lawlessness, and a general adverse reaction against the Lapuans greatly eroded their already dwindling popular support. In addition to this, the kidnapping was decisive in forcing the election of Pehr Evind Svinhufvud to the presidency against Ståhlberg in February 1931. After the kidnapping the Lapuans threatened to assassinate Ståhlberg.

Reaction
Ståhlberg's kidnapping was also widely covered in foreign newspapers. Swedish newspapers in particular wrote on the subject. In Sweden, the news caused even a slight foreign policy scandal. When Dagens Nyheter wrote that such news should come from Mexico or one of the "Nigger republics" and not from a Western European cultural state, the Mexican ambassador in Stockholm protested vehemently. The Mexican ambassador reminded that Mexico is a cultural state and should not be equated with a country like Finland.

References 

1930 crimes in Finland
Kidnapping in Finland
Political history of Finland
Political violence